The Worst Idea of All Time is a podcast hosted by New Zealand comedians Tim Batt and Guy Montgomery where they watch and review the same film every week for a year. In each season, the film chosen is one neither of the hosts have seen before and is generally considered to be a bad film.

Background 
The original concept, as stated in the first episode of season one, was to watch Grown Ups 2 "until it became worthwhile". The hosts adapted the scope of the podcast to watching the film once a week for a full calendar year. Some other films that were considered for season one were Con Air and The Room, but they were passed over for being too good and too bad respectively. In episode two of season one, Montgomery claimed that his main reason for hosting the podcast was to become better friends with Batt.

Seasons

Season 1 
In the first season, the hosts watched the Adam Sandler comedy Grown Ups 2 once per week for 52 weeks. Neither of them had seen the first Grown Ups film.

The final viewing occurred in Los Angeles. Batt and Montgomery began an Indiegogo campaign promising that, if they reached their goal, both would have a picture of Patrick Schwarzenegger, who has a small role in the film, tattooed on their bodies. They fulfilled this promise when their goal was passed.

Season 2 
In the second season, the hosts watched Sex and the City 2 every week for a year. The film was chosen off the back of a gag that was hastily included at the end of a video Batt made about finishing the first season.

Sex And The City 2 has a run time of 2 hours and 26 minutes, making it a full 45 minutes longer than Grown Ups 2.

Season 3 
In the third season, the hosts watched the 2015 drama We Are Your Friends. In the first episode of the season, Batt mentioned that they had received a lot of feedback about how they had broken the spirit of the podcast by not choosing a sequel or a particularly terrible film, but both hosts concluded that there were never any rules stating that the film had to be either.

Season 4 
In the fourth season, the hosts watch the 2008 movie Sex and the City.

Emergency Season 
During a lockdown in New Zealand during the COVID-19 pandemic, the hosts watched Home Alone 3 every three days to produce a nine-episode season, plus a spoof of a director's commentary.

Season 5 
At the end of September, 2020, Montgomery and Batt have undertaken the fifth season, and instead of rewatching the same movie every week they are watching a different movie from the same film series. The series they are picking from for the fifth season is the French/American Emmanuelle series of softcore pornography.

Season 6 
At the end of November 2022, Montgomery and Batt announced a new season, to begin in December 2022.  The hosts will watch each of the Fast & Furious movies in reverse order, a number of times equal to that film's position in the sequence, i.e. F9 nine times, The Fate of the Furious eight times.

Other episodes 
In addition to regular season episodes, the show has put out various bonus episodes.

Friendzone 
Friendzone episodes began during the second season as a way to thank contributors to the podcast. The hosts read emails and social media messages sent in.

Reviews and DirComms 
Halfway through the second season, Batt and Montgomery created a Patreon page where subscribers could vote on a movie for the hosts to watch and record a directors commentary on. At the conclusion of season three, they decided to begin releasing the Patreon podcasts as part of their regular feed for free.

Episodes released discuss the films:

 Jingle All the Way (1996)
 Batman and Robin (1997)
 Southland Tales (2006)
 Superbabies: Baby Geniuses 2 (2004)
 God's Not Dead (2014)
 Toys (1992)
 Pass Thru (2016)
 Fateful Findings (2013)
 Jack and Jill (2011)
 I Am Here....Now (2009)
 Lost in Space (1998)
 From Justin to Kelly (2003)
 Nacho Libre (2006)
 Double Down (2005)
 Love on a Leash (2011)
 Foodfight! (2012)
 The Watch (2012)
 Gigli (2003)
 Jersey Girl (2004)
 Kirk Cameron's Saving Christmas (2014)
 Rapsittie Street Kids: Believe In Santa (2002)
 Van Wilder (2002)
 D.C. Cab (1983)
 Bucky Larson: Born to Be a Star (2011)
 The Book of Henry (2017)

Related media 
In 2015, the hosts teamed up with Justin, Travis, and Griffin McElroy, hosts of the podcast My Brother, My Brother and Me, to create the annually recorded 'Til Death Do Us Blart, in which the hosts must watch Paul Blart: Mall Cop 2 every Thanksgiving for the rest of their lives. Each host has a replacement host who takes their place when they die.

Batt also began a podcast network called Little Empire Podcasts, which includes shows hosted by various New Zealand comedians. The company's podcasts include Boners of the Heart, The Male Gayz, The Walk Out Boys, Hosting and Polidicks.

In October 2021, Tim Batt appeared as a guest on the "Grown Ups 2" episode of movie podcast Diminishing Returns. He watched it again as part of his preparation for the appearance.

References

External links
 

Audio podcasts
2014 podcast debuts
Comedy and humor podcasts
Film and television podcasts